This is a list of gliders/sailplanes of the world, (this reference lists all gliders with references, where available) 
Note: Any aircraft can glide for a short time, but gliders are designed to glide for longer.

B

Babiński
(Zbigniew Babiński)
 Babiński 1912 glider
 Babiński 1913 glider
 Babiński II

BAC
(British Aircraft Company)
 B.A.C. I
 B.A.C. II
 B.A.C. III
 B.A.C. IV
 B.A.C. V
 B.A.C. VI
 B.A.C. VII
 B.A.C. VII Planette
 B.A.C. VIII Bat-Boat
 B.A.C. IX
 B.A.C. Drone

Bacerka
 Bacerka (glider)

Bachem
(Eric Bachem / Bachem-Werke)
 Bachem Leichtwindensegler
 Bachem Lerche
 Bachem Thermikus

Backstrom
(Al Backstrom)
 Backstrom EPB-1 Flying Plank
 Backstrom WPB-1 Powered Plank
 Backstrom Flying Plank II

Baden-Baden
(Segelflugzeugwerke Baden-Baden)
 Baden-Baden glider

Bagalini
(BAGALINI, Marino)
 Bagalini Bagaliante
 Bagalini Colombo

Bailey-Moyes
(Bob Bailey / Moyes Microlights Pty Ltd)
 Bailey-Moyes Tempest

Baitler
(Miroslav Baitler / I. skupina konstruktérů Aero, Praha (Prague))
 Můra 1922

Baker McMillen
(Frank Gröss / Baker McMillen)
 Baker McMillen Cadet

Ball 
(James Noel Ball)
 Ball 1929 glider
 Ball 1930 glider

Bange 
(John J. Bange)
 Bange 1936 glider
 Bange Azure Star

Bange
(John J. Bange - Clifton, Queensland, Australia)
 Bange Azure Star (Bange Z-B-I)
 Bange Azure Star II (Bange Z-B-II)

Bango-Schmid
(Bango & Schmid)
 Bango-Schmid 1930 glider

Barbat-Dunn-Rigby
(BARBAT, Edward & DUNN, Colin & RIGBY, Colin)
 Barbat-Dunn-Rigby GBDR

Bǎrboi
(Ion Bǎrboi)
 Bǎrboi 1932 glider
 Bǎrboi 1934 glider

Bardin
(René Bardin)
 Bardin Alérion
 Bardin Alérion Biplace
 Bardin B-1 Vauville

Barel
(Graal Aéro / Max Barel)
 Barel Graal

Barnaby
(Ralph Barnaby)
 Ralph Barnaby 1909 glider

Baron
(A. Baron)
 Baron Aéro Ramo-Planeur

Barratt-Bradley
(Jock Barratt & Harold Bradley / Waikerie Gliding Club)
 Barratt-Bradley Pelican 2

Barros
(Cláudio Pinto de Barros / Centro de Estudos Aeronáuticos (CEA) / Universidade Federal de Minas Gerais (UFMG), Bello Horizonte, Brazil)
 Barros CB-1 Gaivota

Barszczowski
(Walenty Barszczowski)
 Barszczowski 1913 Glider

Barta
(Karl Barta)
 Barta Dactylus 2
 Barta Dactylus 3

Bartel
(Ryszard Bartel)
 Bartel 1 Glider
 Bartel 2 Glider

Bartos/Nobel
 Bartos/Nobel BN-1 Phantom

Bates
(Carl Stephen BATES, Clear Lake, Iowa (USA) / Popular Mechanics)
 Popular Mechanics Glider

Baudoux-Orta
(Pierre Baudoux & José Orta / Ateliers Orta, Saint-Hubert, Belgium)
 Baudoux-Orta SBO

Ted Bauer
(Ted Bauer / San Gabriel Academy students, Californie, USA)
 Bauer Bird

Bäumer
(Bäumer Aero GmbH, Hamburg / Paul Bäumer)
 Bäumer B-1 Roter Vogel

Bazin
(Albert Bazin)
 Bazin 1904
 Bazin 1905
 Bazin 1909

Bazzocchi
(Ermanno Bazzocchi)
 Bazzocchi EB.1 Littore
 Bazzocchi EB.2

Bauer
 Bauer Bz.II

Beatty-Johl
 Beatty-Johl BJ-2 Assegai
 Beatty-Johl BJ-3
 Beatty-Johl BJ-4

Beaufort Gliding Club
(Lyon, Douglas – Beaufort Gliding Club, Victoria, Australia)
 Beaufort Gliding Club Zephyrus
 Beaufort Gliding Club Phoenix

Bede
(Jim Bede)
 Bede BD-2
 Bede BD-5S

Bekmanis
(Edvins Bekmanis)
 Bekmanis Gaigalina
 Bekmanis Spriditis

Bėkšta
(Romualdas Bėkšta)
 Bėkšta RB-11

Belin brothers.
 Belin bros. 1908 glider

Bellanger-Denhaut
(DENHAUT, François - BELLANGER Frères)
 Bellanger-Denhaut BD-1

Belyayev
(Viktor Nikolayevich Belyayev)
 Belyayev BP-3
 Belyayev EF-1
 Belyayev EF-2

Benes
(Pavel Beneš)
 Benes LD 605 Haban - post-war military assault glider under construction, but cancelled 1951

Bennett-Carter
(George Bennett & Richard Carter)
 Bennett-Carter Dottie S

Benz
(Ing. Hans Benz, Mönchen-Gladbach.)
 Benz Be-2

Berca 
(Jorge Berca)
 Berca JB-1
 Berca JB-2
 Berca JB-3
 Berca JB-4

Berger
(M. Berger in Lyon and flown by Gardey)
 Berger 1905 glider

Berkshire
(Berkshire Manufacturing Corporation)
 Berkshire Concept 70

Berkout
 Berkout (glider)

Berliaux-Salètes
 Berliaux-Salètes 1909 glider no.1
 Berliaux-Salètes 1909 Pourquoi Pas? II

Berliner Segelflugvereins
 Berliner Segelflugvereins 1923 primary

Bertelli
 Bertelli Aerostave

Bertin 
(Bertin (glider constructor))
 Bertin Compact
 Bertin B-12

Besneux
(Alain Besneux)
 Besneux P.70

Bielany School
 Bielany School Glider

Bikle
(Paul Bikle)
 Bikle T-6

Bilski
 Bilski Mewa (Gull) No.14 – Second Polish Glider Contest 17 May – 15 June 1925

Bína
(Karel Bína / B. Metyš & J. Litomyšl Matoušek)
 Bína Litomyšl-1

Binder
 Binder EB28
 Binder EB29
 Binder ASH-25 EB28

Biot
 Biot Massia

Birdman
(Birdman Enterprises)
 Birdman Project 102 Windsoar

Birmingham Guild
 Birmingham Guild BG-100
 Birmingham Guild BG-135

Birò Regina
 Birò Regina

Birrlauf 
(Benny Birrlauf)
 Birrlauf Beny I
 Birrlauf Gerspach

Bisser
 Bisser – Bulgaria

Bistrama & Puławski
 Bistrama & Puławski SL-3 No.8 – Second Polish Glider Contest 17 May – 15 June 1925

Blaicher 
(Michal Blaicher)
 Blaicher B.1
 Blaicher B-38

Bland
(Lilian E. Bland – Ireland)
 Bland Mayfly

Błażyński
(Alojzy Błażyński)
 Błażyński Polon – First Polish Glider Contest August 1923

Bleriot
(Louis Blériot)
 Blériot II

Blessing
(Gerhard Blessing / Sportverein Merseburg)
 Blessing Rebell
 Blessing V-7 Gleiter-Max
 Blessing Kolibri-B
 Blessing Falter-Scooter

Bley
(Bley Flugzeugbau GmbH, Naumberg)
 Bley M-Condor

Blogoslawienstwo
 Blogoslawienstwo

Blohm & Voss
 Blohm & Voss BV 40
 Blohm & Voss BV 246

Bock
(John W. Bock)
 Bock 1

Boeing
 Boeing Steel Truss Glider

Bohatyrew
(Michal Bohatyrew)
 Bohatyrew Motyl
 Bohatyrew Miś (Miś - Teddy Bear) (No.12) – Second Polish Glider Contest 17 May – 15 June 1925

Bohemia
(HALLER, Oldřich)
 Bohemia B.5

Böhm
 Böhm Schmankerl foot-launched rigid flying wing glider

Bölkow
 Bölkow Phönix
 Bölkow Phoebus

Bolton
 Bolton 1932

Bonn
 Bonn Helge
 Bonn I Vulkan
 Bonn Schlägel und Eisen

Bonnet
(Pierre Bonnet - Louis Clément - Henri Mignet)
 Bonnet double monoplan
 Bonnet-Clément BC-1
 Bonnet-Clément BC-7
 Bonnet-Mignet 1923 glider

Bonnet-Labranche
(Émile Bonnet-Labranche / Ateliers vosgiens Saint Dié)
 Bonnet-Labranche 1909 glider

Bonomi 
(Aeronautica Bonomi)
 Bossi-Bonomi Pedaliante
 Bonomi BS.2 Balestruccio
 Bonomi BS.4 Basettino
 Bonomi BS.5 Ballerina
 Bonomi BS.7 Allievo Italia
 Bonomi BS.8 Biancone
 Bonomi BS.9 Bertina
 Bonomi BS.10 Ardea
 Bonomi BS.11 Milano
 Bonomi BS.12 Roma
 Bonomi BS.14 Astore
 Bonomi BS.15 Bigiarella
 Bonomi BS.16 Allievo Bonomi
 Bonomi BS.17 Allievo Cantù
 Bonomi BS.18 Airone
 Bonomi BS.19 Alca
 Bonomi BS.20 Albanella
 Bonomi BS.22 Alzavola
 Bonomi BS.24 Biposto Roma
 Bonomi BS.28 Alcione
 Bonomi BS.28 Aerodinamico

Borchn-Anemon
(BORCHN, A. A. & ANEMON, O. K.)
 Borchn-Anemon BA-1 Tandem (Борчн- Анмонов БА-1)

Borghese
 Borghese 1931 hyydroglider

Borzecki 
(Jozef Borzecki)
 Borzecki Alto-Stratus
 Borzecki Cirrus
 Borzecki JB-4 Skowronek
 Borzecki Stratus

Bottini
 Bottini Mabo

Boulay-Ferrier
(Jacques Boulay & Hubert Ferrier)
 Boulay-Ferrier Condor

Boulay-Menin
(Jacques Boulay & Menin)
 Boulay-Menin BM-1

Bourieau-Chapautau
 Bourieau-Chapautau glider

Bowers (glider constructor)
 Bowers Bantam

Bowlus
(Michael Bowlus)
 Bowlus BZ-1

Bowlus-du Pont
(William Hawley Bowlus)
 Bowlus M1-PU3
 Bowlus 1912 glider
 Bowlus Albatross 1 Falcon
 Bowlus Albatross 2
 Bowlus Albatross Senior
 Bowlus Dragontross
 Bowlus Flying Wing
 Bowlus Super Albatross
 Bowlus Super Sailplane
 Bowlus 1-S-2100 Senior Albatross
 Bowlus BA-100 Baby Albatross
 Bowlus BA-102 Two-place Baby Albatross
 Bowlus BS-100 Super Albatross
 Bowlus BT-100 Baby Albatross
 Bowlus BTS-100 Two-place Baby Albatross
 Bowlus G-100 Galloping Gertie
 Bowlus-Criz MC-1
 Bowlus-Criz MC-1 1/2 scale
 Bowlus SP-1 Paper Wing
 Bowlus XCG-7
 Bowlus XCG-8
 Bowlus XCG-16
 Bowlus/Nelson Dragonfly
 Bowlus XBM-5 - 
 Bowlus XTG-12 TG-12 - 1942 Bowlus XBM-5,2-seat tandem-seat, mid-wing training glider, XBM-5 = Experimental Bowlus Military, Design number 5
 Bowlus TG-12A: unrelated Bowlus-DuPont built M1PU3** 'Utility', 1 impressed ([designer Heath] McDowell, 1-place, Utility, 3rd design [?])

Bramingham
 Bramingham 1934 glider

Bräutigam
(Bernhard Bräutigam / Flugzeugbau Braütigam G.m.b.H. Weimar)
 Bräutigam Super Orchidee (D-STURM regn.)

Brditschka 
(Heinz Brditschka)
 Brditschka Raab Krähe
 Brditschka-Militki MB-E1 Electric One
 Brditschka HB-21
 Brditschka HB-22
 Brditschka HB-23

Breeze
 Breeze Oozle Bird

Bréguet
(Société anonyme des ateliers d'aviation Louis Breguet)
 Bréguet Br 900 Louisette
 Bréguet Br 901 Mouette
 Bréguet Br 902 Cinzano
 Bréguet Br 903
 Bréguet Br 904 Nymphale
 Bréguet Br 905 Fauvette 
 Bréguet Br 906 Choucas 
 Bréguet Br 907
 Bréguet Colibri
 Bréguet P-1
 Bréguet P-2

Bremen-Lane
 Bremen-Lane glider

Bremer
(Karl Bremer)
 Bremer Max
 Bremer Strolch
 Bremer Motorisiert SG-38

Briegleb
(William G. Briegleb)
 Briegleb BG-01 Utility
 Briegleb BG-02
 Briegleb BG-03
 Briegleb BG-04
 Briegleb BG-06
 Briegleb BG-07
 Briegleb BG-08
 Briegleb BG-12
 Briegleb BG-16
 NASA Dryden-Briegleb M2-F1
 Briegleb TG-9

Briffaud
(Georges Briffaud)
 Briffaud GB.1
 Briffaud GB.2
 Briffaud GB.9
 Briffaud GB.80 Aérovoilier

Bright Star
 Bright Star Swift

Bristol
(Bristol Aeronautical Corporation)
 Bristol XLRQ

Bristol
(Bristol Aeroplane Company)
 Bristol Glider (1910)

Brno
(Brno Technical university)
 Brno Technical university ASP-3 – (a.k.a. NSv-3 Cyrillic acronym)

Broburn
(Broburn Sailplanes Ltd, Woodley)
 Broburn Wanderlust

Brochet 
(Avions Maurice Brochet / Constructions Aéronautiques Maurice Brochet)
 Brochet Beynes-CAU
 Brochet Brocheteau
 Brochet MB-10 Ginette
 Brochet MB-20

Brochocki
(Stefan Brochocki, Witold Kasper and A. Bodek)
 Brochocki BKB-1

Brokker (glider constructor)
 Brokker (glider)

Brondel 
(Christian Brondel)
 Brondel Cavok 10
 Brondel CB-12
 Brondel CB-15 Crystal
 Brondel Hélium
 Brondel ST-11
 Brondel ST-12
 Brondel ST-15

Brookes
(Wilfred Brookes)
 Brookes 1919 glider

Brown
(Vincent Brown & STC-GC (Sydney Technical College Gliding Club))
 Brown Two Seater
 Brown Rebel

Brown
(Leeroy Brown/ Southdown SkySailing Club)
 Brown 1931 glider

Bruni
(Giovanni Bruni / Aéroclub Vergiate)
 Bruni 3V-1 Eolo

Bryan Aircraft Company
See Schreder.

Brylinski
(Brylinski, Jacques & Wehrle, Jean)
 Brylinski JJ-2
 Brylinski JJ-3
 Brylinski Petrel

BS (glider constructor)
 BS 1K

BSV
(Berliner Segelflugvereins - HOHMUTH, Otto)
 BSV 1923 glider
 BSV Luftikus

Buchanan
(John Buchanan)
 Buchanan Ricochet

Bucher Leichtbau
(Heinrich Bucher)
see Farner

Budig
(Friedrich Wilhelm Budig)
 Budig 1921 glider

Bums
 Bums glider
 Bünzli
(Bunzli, Henri René / Société de Construction d'Appareils Aériens, Levallois)
 Bünzli 1908 glider

Burbulmate
 Burbulmate

Busso
 Busso San Giorgio

Butterworth-Ypinazar
 Butterworth-Ypinazar Primary

Buxton 
(G. Mungo Buxton)
 Buxton Hjordis
 Buxton Hjordis 2
 Buxton B-5
 Buxton Tailless Tailless

Buxton
(Jay Buxton)
 Buxton Roundair – Jay Buxton
 Buxton Transporter – Jay Buxton

Bydgoszczy
 Bydgoszczy Żabuś

Notes

Further reading

External links

Lists of glider aircraft